Ted Jarrard (15 April 1922 - 25 November 2010) was an Australian rules footballer in the Victorian Football League (VFL).

Jarrard joined North Melbourne in 1944. He was a member of the 1950 North Melbourne Grand Final side. He retired in 1953. In 2001 Jarrad was named on the half back flank in the North Melbourne Team of the Century.

Jarrard was captain / coach of Camberwell Football Club in 1954.

He later had stints at Fitzroy Rovers and Jeparit.

External links

References

North Melbourne Football Club players
Camberwell Football Club players
Camberwell Football Club coaches
Australian rules footballers from Victoria (Australia)
1922 births
2010 deaths